St Luke's & Queen Street Church is a congregation of the Church of Scotland in Broughty Ferry, on the edge of Dundee, Scotland. The church building was completed in 1884 to designs by Edinburgh architect Hippolyte Blanc, and is now protected as a category A listed building.

History
St Luke's was established as a congregation of the Free Church of Scotland in 1878, and worshipped in an iron building now in use as the church hall. The Free Church merged with the United Presbyterian Church of Scotland in 1900, and then these merged with the Church of Scotland in 1929. In 1953, the congregation of St Luke's was united with that of Queen Street Church.

References

St Luke's & Queen Street Church - 125 Years On - A History compiled by Ian Munro
A Hundred Years 1878-1978 - A Brief History compiled by Rev S G MacNab MA BD HCF (out of print)

External links
The church's website

Broughty Ferry
Churches in Dundee
19th-century Presbyterian churches
Churches completed in 1884
19th-century Church of Scotland church buildings
Category A listed buildings in Dundee
Listed churches in Scotland
Hippolyte Blanc buildings
Broughty Ferry